Mirza Abdul Halim (1927/8 – 9 July 2021) was a Bangladesh Nationalist Party politician and the former Member of Parliament of Pabna-12.

Career
Halim was elected to parliament from Pabna-12 as a Bangladesh Nationalist Party candidate in 1979. He was the state minister for shipping in the first cabinet of President Ziaur Rahman.

Death 
Halim died on 9 July 2021 at the age of 93.

References

1920s births
2021 deaths
Bangladesh Nationalist Party politicians
2nd Jatiya Sangsad members
State Ministers of Shipping